Dead on Arrival is a Nancy Drew and Hardy Boys Supermystery crossover novel, published in 1995.

Plot summary
Nancy Drew is called in to assist Brenda Carlson, a journalist at a local newspaper. Pam Harter, ace investigative journalist at Brenda's paper, is missing. Meanwhile, the Hardys go undercover as EMTs to catch the ghouls who have been holding up ambulances and stealing bodies. They meet Nancy when she finds Pam Harter's body and team up with her to find the guilty party.

References

External links
Dead on Arrival at Fantastic Fiction
Supermystery series books

Supermystery
1995 American novels
1995 children's books
Body snatching